"Animal" is a song by Spanish-German singer-songwriter Álvaro Soler. It was written by Soler, Simon Triebel, Rune Westberg and Rune Westberg for the reissue of his debut studio album Eterno Agosto (2015). Production was overseen by Triebel, Westberg, and Zuchowski. Released as the album's fifth and final single in February 2017, it reached number seven on the Polish Airplay Top 100, while peaking at number 22 on the Ultratip Bubbling Under in the Flemish Region of Belgium.

Track listings

Charts

References

2017 singles
Spanish-language songs
2016 songs
Álvaro Soler songs
Songs written by Simon Triebel
Songs written by Rune Westberg
Songs written by Álvaro Soler